PolyDay is a one-day convention/conference held in the UK, celebrating polyamory. Polyday began in 2004 and has been run most years since. The event consists of workshops and discussions during the day and social events in the evening. In 2012 it became associated with the international event, Poly Party Weekend. As of 2016, Polyday became an unincorporated charitable association.

The content of each Polyday differs slightly each year. Features that have been consistent so far include a basic introduction to polyamory, useful literature, people to chat to, arts/crafts and cake. Other sessions such as activism, poly parenting, relationship styles and mental/sexual health have been offered.

Everyone is welcome, whether they are poly or not, partners, friends or allies of poly people provided they are open and accepting of other attendees. Strict rules apply to photography and members of the press who wish to attend, so as to protect the privacy of other attendees.

Polyday 2022 will be held on 15 October 2022, at Resource for London in London.

Past events

The first Polyday, in 2004, was held at the Leicester LGB Centre. Following this other events have happened in London every year since 2006 – except for the 2010 event, held in Bristol. Polyday 2020 and 2021 were cancelled due to the novel coronavirus pandemic, with Polyday set for 15 October 2022 at a new London venue.

See also
 Polyamory

References

External links
 Polyday – Official Website
 Polytical.org – UK-centric Poly ezine and activist hub
 Polyamory.org.uk – UK resource on Polyamory  
 Polyday LiveJournal – An active online community

Cultural conferences
Polyamory